Norman Russell Young (February 23, 1946 – April 14, 2021) was an American guitarist, vocalist and songwriter, best known as one of the frontmen in the influential country rock and Americana band Poco.

A virtuoso on pedal steel guitar, he was celebrated for the ability to get a Hammond B3 organ sound out of the instrument by playing it through a Leslie speaker cabinet and as an innovator of producing other rock sounds from the instrument.

Early life
Young was born in Long Beach, California and raised in Colorado. He began playing lap steel guitar at age 6, and taught guitar and steel guitar lessons during his high school years at Jefferson High School, Lakewood, Colorado with George Grantham. During that time, he also played country music in late night bars. Young played in a well known Denver psychedelic rock band "Boenzee Cryque".

Career

Poco
In the late 1960s, an acquaintance of Young's, Miles Thomas, became the road manager for Buffalo Springfield. Richie Furay and Jim Messina needed a steel guitarist for the Furay ballad "Kind Woman" on their final album Last Time Around and after Thomas told Young about the opportunity, Young was hired.  Along with Furay and Messina, Young became a founding member of Poco in 1968 upon the former band's demise. Drummer George Grantham and bass player Randy Meisner rounded out the original Poco lineup. The band's membership fluctuated over the years. After Furay left the group, Young took on more song writing responsibility, along with Paul Cotton and Timothy B. Schmit. Young is best known for writing the Poco songs "Rose of Cimarron" and "Crazy Love". In 2013, Young was inducted into the Steel Guitar Hall of Fame. At the end of 2013, Young announced his retirement, but it turned out that it was a short-lived retirement.

A few shows were booked into 2014 including three farewell shows in Florida. One of those shows was a performance in a recording studio in front of a live audience for a DVD document of the band's live show. Young said there could be some one-offs in the future after that, but the band would not be actively touring as before. Young and Jack Sundrud wrote and recorded music for children's story videos as the "Session Cats". Young continued to do guest performances with former members of Poco and other country rock artists. Young released his first solo album in 2017 on Blue Élan Records,
Waitin' For The Sun. Young released his first new music since Waitin' for the Sun on March 22, 2019. The new tune, "Listen to Your Heart", was released digitally and benefited a local Steelville, Missouri animal charity, Santana's Hope for Paws (Friends of Steelville, MO Pound) Animal Shelter.

Death
Young died of a heart attack on April 14, 2021. He was 75 years old.

References

External links
 Interview with Rusty Young on Yuzu Melodies

1946 births
2021 deaths
American rock guitarists
American male guitarists
Poco members
Pedal steel guitarists
Musicians from Long Beach, California
Guitarists from California
20th-century American guitarists
20th-century American male musicians
The Sky Kings members